San Rafael del Moján is a town in Zulia State in Venezuela. Around 40 km from Maracaibo, it is the shire town of the Mara Municipality.

Populated places in Zulia